Sebastiania panamensis is a species of flowering plant in the family Euphorbiaceae. It was described in 1988. It is native from Costa Rica to western Panama.

References

Plants described in 1988
Flora of Costa Rica
Flora of Panama
panamensis